Adrie Zwartepoorte (18 February 1917 – 24 March 1991) was a Dutch cyclist. He competed in the team pursuit event at the 1936 Summer Olympics.

See also
 List of Dutch Olympic cyclists

References

External links
 

1917 births
1991 deaths
Dutch male cyclists
Olympic cyclists of the Netherlands
Cyclists at the 1936 Summer Olympics
People from Den Helder
Cyclists from North Holland